The People's Republic of China's 114th Division is a division of the People's Armed Police. Originally a division of the People's Liberation Army, it is currently designated the People's Armed Police Unit 8640 and is under the direct command of the People's Armed Police Headquarters, forming the People's Armed Police's mechanized response force. Other roles include provision of security for major public events.

History
Originally the unit was the 111th Division of the North-East Army which fought against the Japanese during the Second Sino-Japanese War, it was later transferred to the Eighth Route Army's Shandong Military Region, and then again to the North East People's Volunteer Army; the unit was redesignated the 114th on transfer to the 38th Army.

As the 114th, under the 38th Army, the division fought as part of the People's Volunteer Army (Chinese People's Volunteers (CPV) or Chinese Communist Forces (CCF)) during the Korean War with a standard strength of approximately 10,000 men. At that time it consisted of the 340th, 341st, and 342nd Regiments.

It fought the Turkish Brigade at the Battle of Wawon, November 27–29, 1950.

The formation remained for many years with the 38th Group Army in the Shenyang Military Region, as the 114th Mechanized Infantry Division.  In 1996, as part of the reform of the People's Liberation Army in the 1990s the 114th (together with 13 other divisions, and some 500,000 personnel) was transferred to the People's Armed Police (PAP), becoming People's Armed Police Unit 8640, and the mechanized reserve of the PAP under the direct control of the PAP headquarters.

The 114th was chosen to represent the PAP during the 2015 China Victory Day Parade.

After the 2017 reform, the division was divided into two detachments (regiment-sized): the 5th Mobile Detachment (garrison Dingzhou, Hebei) and the 6th Mobile Detachment (garrison Baoding, Hebei) under the PAP 1st Mobile Corps.

Composition

People's Armed Police 340th Regiment (People's Armed Police Unit 8641), garrison Mancheng, Hebei
People's Armed Police 341th Regiment (People's Armed Police Unit 8642), garrison Tangxian, Hebei
People's Armed Police 342nd Regiment (People's Armed Police Unit 8643), garrison Dingzhou, Hebei
People's Armed Police 703rd Regiment (People's Armed Police Unit 8644), garrison Wangdu, Hebei
People's Armed Police 704th Regiment (People's Armed Police Unit 8645), garrison Zhengding, Hebei

See also
ODON

References 

Units and formations of the People's Armed Police